The Craemer Group is a company based in the German town of Herzebrock-Clarholz (district of Gütersloh, North Rhine-Westphalia). Today, the company, founded in 1912 by Paul Craemer as  Press-, Stanz- und Hammerwerke GmbH, employs a staff of around 1000 in metal forming, tool making and plastics processing  and achieved a total operating performance of around 300 million Euros in 2021.  The group consists of the umbrella company Craemer Holding GmbH, its subsidiary Craemer GmbH and the subsidiaries thereof.

Company profile 
The Craemer Group is an internationally active family company specialised in metal forming, plastics processing and tool making. Their headquarters is the Craemer GmbH founded in 1912 and located in the German town of Herzebrock-Clarholz. Today, the group consists of the following operating companies: the German headquarters with production in all three business activities, a metal factory each in Liptovský Mikuláš, Slovakia (Craemer Slovakia, s.r.o.) and in Attendorn, Germany (Craemer Attendorn GmbH & Co. KG) as well as a plastics injection moulding facility in Telford, Great Britain (Craemer UK Ltd). For the sales of its plastic programme, the Group also has an independent sales office each in Lesquin (Lille metropolitan area) (Craemer France Sarl) and in Florida (Craemer US Corporation) and a branch office in Poland.

In Metal Forming, Craemer develops, constructs and manufactures precision-stamped and large parts mainly for the automotive industry, above all for the interior: primarily seat pans but also seating components, elements for seatbelt systems and doors as well as crossbar beams.

The focus of Plastics Processing lies in the development, production and marketing of plastic pallets, pallet boxes, storage and transport containers as well as wheeled waste bins. Under the product brand Palcontrol®, Craemer offers "intelligent pallets" and provides complete solutions based on RFID technology in order to optimise logistics processes.

All the tools and moulds needed for production are made by Craemer's own Tool Making facility. With the production of their entire product range, the company ranks among the leading European producers and is also recognised as one of the world's leading manufacturers of high-quality plastic pallets.

History

In May 1912 the engineer Paul Craemer (1874–1940) founded the Press-, Stanz- und Hammerwerke GmbH for metal forming in the German town of Herzebrock, East-Westphalia. A rolling mill was established on the new premises on the outskirts of Herzebrock in 1928.

After the Second World War, the eldest grandson of the company founder, Hans-Joachim Brandenburg, began the reconstruction of the company. In the 1950s the company was recognised as a major supplier of parts for agricultural machinery. In 1958, Craemer opened a new business activity for plastics processing and started with the injection moulding of large containers. In 1967, the company developed the worldwide first plastic pallet moulded in one shot, for which they received a patent in the same year. In the 1980s waste disposal containers were included in the plastic product range. In the business field of metal forming, 1978 marked the demolition of the hot rolling mill and thus the final change to the processing of cold rolling sheets. In the 1980s Craemer became established as an automotive supplier, manufacturing metal formed parts for cars.

In 1997, the production started in the metal plant in Slovakia. In 2001, Craemer took over the Kliko-Entsorgunssysteme GmbH (Waste Disposal Systems), opened a plastics processing plant in Telford in 2006 and founded a distribution company in the Paris metropolitan area on May 1, 2009. In 2015, Craemer took over the SKA GmbH & Co. KG, a well-established, German metal processing company in Attendorn, Sauerland Region (Olpe district).

References 

Companies based in North Rhine-Westphalia
Tool manufacturing companies of Germany
Plastics companies of Germany
Manufacturing companies established in 1912
1912 establishments in Germany